Robert Grieve MacAndrew (1869 – April 4, 1951) was a Scottish-born golf professional and a master blacksmith who in his youth became proficient in making golf clubs. He was born and raised in St Andrews, Scotland, and from 1895 to 1898 served as a club maker there. In 1898 at the age of 29 he was recruited to the U.S. to supervise the manufacture of golf clubs for the A.G. Spalding Company in Massachusetts. To supplement his income, MacAndrew gave golf lessons and helped in constructing golf courses, saving money to pay for the passage of his wife and children to the U.S. from Scotland.

There was a wave of popularity of golf in the U.S. about this time which fueled demand for golf course construction and MacAndrew's career timing could not have been better. He developed a reputation as  golf course designer and golf instructor, quit golf club manufacture, and became the golf pro at various country clubs. He competed in the U.S. Open Championship in 1904.  Each of his four sons became a professional golfers at various country clubs in the United States.

Early life
MacAndrew was born in St Andrews, Fifeshire, Scotland, in 1869. He became a U.S. citizen in 1918. He had an eighth grade education. His wife was Mary Lamond Murray (1872–1930) who died at age 58. MacAndrew had eight children: Agnes, Mary, James, Charlotte, Robert, John, Charles and Ruth.

Immigration to the U.S.
MacAndrew arrived in New York in 1899 to go to Chicopee Falls, Massachusetts, to supervise the manufacture of golf clubs for the Spalding Company. During this time, Spalding became embroiled in a dispute with its former supplier, Overman Wheel Company, and business suffered. MacAndrew was subsequently offered a job by one of Spalding's competitors, Crawford, McGregor, and Canby, another of the early U.S. golf club makers. When his family arrived in 1900, they all moved to Dayton, Ohio, the home of Crawford, McGregor & Canby.

Career
MacAndrew began to develop a reputation, said 1930 Tennessean sportswriter Tony Scheffer, "as a teacher of note turning out some wonderful golfers under his diligent tutelage". MacAndrew secured a contract to design a golf course in Nashville for a new country club called the "Nashville Golf and Country Club" in 1901. Nashvillians were becoming interested in golf, but there were only crude golf courses available then, some with holes of only 50 yards. A group of prominent citizens decided to form a golf-based country club that had a golf course of the quality of those in Scotland; they hired MacAndrew to design and build it. When he arrived in Nashville, MacAndrew rejected their chosen site at Cumberland Park (later the site of Tennessee State Fairgrounds) and told the club president he would have to purchase an alternate site. They complied by obtaining land on the Whitworth estate near West End Avenue at Bowling Avenue in Nashville and MacAndrew returned to lay out and build a nine-hole course. After completion, he returned to Dayton, where his fifth child (Robert) was born. In 1902, the Nashville group requested him to return, this time as their permanent golf professional and greenskeeper. He moved his family to Nashville, where his sixth child (John) was born.

In 1904, MacAndrew accepted a new position as golf pro at The Wollaston Club in Milton, Massachusetts, and, as second project, to design a new golf course in New York. He competed in the tenth U.S. Open in July 1904. He later moved on to work as golf pro/greenskeeper at West Warwick Country Club and Potowomut Country Club, both in Rhode Island.

A family of golf professionals
MacAndrew's four sons followed his career path to become professional golfers: James, Robert, John (Jock) and Charles. Two of them (James and Jock) predeceased him.

James W. MacAndrew (1895–1942) worked in Nashville as the first pro at Richland Country Club in Nashville (1914) and later in Fall River, Massachusetts;
Robert P. MacAndrew (1901–1963) was the golf pro at Mount Pleasant Golf Club in Lowell, Massachusetts, in 1927;
John (Jock) A. MacAndrew (1904–1928) was the pro at Nashua, New Hampshire. He won the Massachusetts State Caddie Championships in 1918 and 1919 and competed in the U.S. Open in 1926 and 1927. Jock and Charles, both under 19, shot 70 and 71 respectively in the qualifying round of the Massachusetts Junior Championship in 1924. Jock died at age 24, of internal hemorrhage from ulcerative colitis;
Charles E. MacAndrew (1907–1952) worked at Laconia, New Hampshire and Burlington, Vermont. He was the pro at Burlington Country Club for 13 years, retiring in 1951. He defeated Gene Sarazen to win the New England Open in 1931. Nearly 500 guests attended "Charlie MacAndrew Day" ceremonies on August 4, 1951 and  established the annual "Charles MacAndrew Memorial Golf Tournament" in his honor, first played in 1953. In 2018, the MacAndrew Memorial 65th tournament was held.

MacAndrew's grandson Donald Jock MacAndrew (Jock's son), became a thoroughbred horse jockey. He rode "Saggy", the horse that famously defeated the previously unbeaten Citation (ridden by Eddie Arcaro) in the Chesapeake Trial Stakes at Havre de Grace Racetrack on April 12, 1948. The Baltimore Sun called it "The horse racing upset that stands for the ages".

Death

Robert G. MacAndrew died at age 81 on April 4, 1951, in Holbrook, Massachusetts, at the home of his granddaughter. He is buried at Mount Wollaston Cemetery in Quincy, Massachusetts.

Notes

References

Scottish male golfers
Golf course architects
Golfers from St Andrews
1951 deaths
1869 births